Ricardo Domínguez (July 20, 1985 – February 22, 2017) was a Mexican professional boxer in the Light Welterweight division. He is best known for having won the 2009 Campeón Azteca tournament at Lightweight.

Professional career
Domínguez won his pro debut against Eduardo Castillo in Culiacán, Sinaloa, Mexico.

Campeón Azteca 
In 2009, he fought at the first Campeón Azteca tournament in the Lightweight division, where he went on to beat Saul Carreon and Jesus Gonzalez in the first two rounds. At the tournament's championship fight he knocked out Reyes Sanchez to not only win the Prize money but also a title fight with the WBC Lightweight Champion.

WBC Lightweight Championship
In May 2010, Dominguez lost his first ever title fight to WBC champion Humberto Soto.

IBF  Lightweight Championship
On November 27, 2010 Ricardo lost to Miguel Vazquez the IBF Lightweight champion in Tijuana, Baja California, Mexico. This was the second title fight for Dominguez.

Professional record

|- style="margin:0.5em auto; font-size:95%;"
| style="text-align:center;" colspan="8"|37 Wins (22 knockouts), 11 Losses, 2 Draws
|-  style="text-align:center; margin:0.5em auto; font-size:95%; background:#e3e3e3;"
|  style="border-style:none none solid solid; "|Res.
|  style="border-style:none none solid solid; "|Record
|  style="border-style:none none solid solid; "|Opponent
|  style="border-style:none none solid solid; "|Type
|  style="border-style:none none solid solid; "|Rd., Time
|  style="border-style:none none solid solid; "|Date
|  style="border-style:none none solid solid; "|Location
|  style="border-style:none none solid solid; "|Notes
|- align=center
| || ||align=left|Antonio Lozada Jr.
| || || April 16, 2011 || align=left|Tijuana, Baja California, Mexico
|align=left|
|- align=center
|Loss || 32-7-2 ||align=left|Miguel Vazquez
|UD || 12  || November 27, 2010 || align=left|Tijuana, Baja California, Mexico
|align=left|For the IBF Lightweight title
|- align=center

References

External links

Boxers from Sinaloa
Sportspeople from Culiacán
Lightweight boxers
1985 births
2017 deaths
Mexican male boxers
Deaths from cancer in Mexico
Deaths from colorectal cancer